The Men's 20 kilometre individual biathlon competition at the 1964 Winter Olympics was held on 4 February, at Seefeld. The firing ranges were located at the following points on the 20-kilometer course: 6 km — 200 meter range, 10.4 km — 250 meter range, 11.8 km — 150 meter range and 17.1 km — 100 meter range. The first three series were fired from a prone position, the last standing. Each miss of the target cost two minutes.

Results 

Vladimir Melanin, the two time defending world champion, won the Olympic title with ease at Seefeld. He was one of just three racers to shoot clear, and also had a very quick ski time; the two men who skied faster than him, Ragnar Tveiten and Veikko Hakulinen had six and twelve minutes of penalties, respectively. This combination saw Melanin win the race by more than three full minutes. The silver medalist, Aleksandr Privalov, a bronze medalist at the last Olympics, had a slower ski time, but like Melanin, shot clear to earn his place. Olav Jordet earned bronze, ahead of Tveiten, as he combined a top-10 skiing time with only a single miss.

References

Biathlon at the 1964 Winter Olympics